Bothriembryon bradshaweri is a species of tropical air-breathing land snail, terrestrial pulmonate gastropod mollusk in the family Bothriembryontidae. This species is endemic to Australia.

References

Bothriembryontidae
Gastropods described in 1939
Taxonomy articles created by Polbot